Yuhua is a subzone region located in the town of Jurong East, Singapore. Yuhua comprises two subzones, Yuhua East and Yuhua West. The area's HDB flats are under the management of Jurong-Clementi Town Council and the people of this precinct are represented in parliament by either Grace Fu or Rahayu Mahzam, depending on where they stay.

Neighbouring areas
 S

Residential areas

HDB

Condominium
Ivory Heights (1986)
Parc Oasis (1995)
Westmere (1999)
The Mayfair (2000)
J Gateway (2017)

Future plans
The 'Jurong Lake District Project' was unveiled in 2008 and set to be completed in 2040 as part of the plan by Urban Redevelopment Authority to provide more job and recreational options in the heartlands.
There will be about 200 000 jobs created and 20 000 homes built in the 360-hectare Jurong Lake District. The district has been divided into two precincts - Jurong Gateway and Lakeside.

Transportation

Roads
The main roads in this precinct are Jurong Town Hall Road, Boon Lay Way and Jurong East Central, which connects the precinct to the rest of the world through the AYE (Exit 13) or the PIE (Exit 29), with major roads (Jurong West Street 11/12/13/31/32/21/24, Jurong East Central 1, Jurong East Avenue 3, Toh Guan Road, Jurong Gateway Road, Gateway Link, Summit Lane and Venture Avenue) winding through the precinct.

Due to the changes of the roads, Jurong Gateway Road had been extended to replace parts of Jurong East Street 12, these had undergone demolition to be rebuilt into Jem. It instead went and joined Toh Guan Road.

Public transport

Mass Rapid Transit
There are 4 Mass Rapid Transit stations that serve the planning area, across 3 lines, the East West Line, the North South Line, and the Jurong Region Line . All lines have an interchange station at Jurong East station. The 4 stations are:

 Jurong East
 Chinese Garden
 Toh Guan
 Bukit Batok West

Feeder bus services
Feeder services 333, 334 and 335 each plies through different parts of the precinct and connects it to Jurong East MRT station, but only 335 goes to Chinese Garden MRT station.

Bus services
Most of the trunk bus services originate from Jurong East Bus Interchange.

Connection through other trunk bus services (not originating from Jurong East) to Jurong West and Clementi is available through 99 and 185, Bukit Batok and Northwards through 176, 178, 180, 187 and 188, and eastwards through 66 & 506. 98 to Jurong East interchange, and 502 to Orchard Road, Marina Bay Sands and CBD.

For the community

Hawker Centre
Apart from the lifestyle options in the town centre, there are also two hawker centres and markets in the precinct. The popular hawker centres, Yuhua Village Market and Food Centre (near future Bukit Batok West MRT station) and Yuhua Market and Hawker Centre (near Chinese Garden MRT station) are both located along Jurong East Ave 1. Several stalls in both hawker centres are consecutively awarded the Michelin Bib Gourmand Award.

Community Centre
The precinct's community centre (Yuhua Community Club) is located along Boon Lay Way, accessible by routes 99, 160, 334 and 506. It is also co-located together with Jurong East Neighbourhood Police Centre.

Schools
There are 2 primary schools (Yuhua and Fuhua) and 2 secondary schools (JurongVille Secondary School and Crest Secondary School) in Yuhua.

Library
The nearest library, Jurong Regional Library, is located at the junction of Gateway Link and Jurong Town Hall Road.

Recreation
Apart from the many playing areas in the precinct, there is a neighbourhood park at the border of Jurong East Street 24 and a canal along the northern border of the precinct. There is also a sports and recreation complex, Jurong East Sports and Recreation Complex, located a 7 minutes walk away from Chinese Garden MRT station.

Shopping centres
 JCube (contains Singapore's first Olympic-size ice skating rink, owned by CapitaLand)
 IMM (owned by CapitaLand)
 Jem (completed in 2013, owned by Lend Lease)
 Westgate (completed in December 2013, owned by CapitaLand)

JCube
The shopping mall, JCube, which also houses Singapore’s first Olympic-size ice skating rink, replaces the former Jurong Entertainment Centre. JCube was built in 2012.

Jem

Jem is a shopping mall cum office development in Singapore, which opened on 15 June 2013. The mall brings a mini Orchard Road experience in the suburbs. Anchor tenants in Jem include IKEA, Fairprice Xtra, Cathay Cineplexes, H&M, Uniqlo, Courts, Koufu and Books Kinokuniya. Its office component has been taken up by the Ministry of National Development and its statutory boards, AVA and BCA.

IMM
An outlet shopping mall cum warehouse development at Jurong East St 21. Once the town's only shopping mall consisting of a Giant Hypermarket, it was refurbished in 2012 to host a variety of outlet stores.

Westgate
A premier family and lifestyle shopping mall cum office development next to Jem, Westgate opened on 2 December 2013. Anchor tenants include Eccelente by HAO mart, Harvey Norman, Timezone, Samsung Store and True Fitness.

Town centres

There are 2 town centres in this precinct, at Jurong Gateway Road and Jurong East Avenue 1.

Places of worship
There are 3 temples, 1 mosque and 1 church in this precinct.

Temples:
Tong Whye Temple 《通准廟》
Bukit Timah Seu Teck Sean Thong 《武吉知馬修德善堂》
Sri Arulmigu Murugan Temple

Mosque:
Masjid Al-Mukminin

Church:
Jurong Seventh-Day Adventist Church

Healthcare
Apart from the many medical clinics in this precinct, 2 medical institutes, Ng Teng Fong General Hospital (a 500-bed hospital) and Jurong Community Hospital, was constructed in 2015 to provide more advanced medical services in Yuhua.
Currently, there are 2 nursing homes in Yuhua, namely the Blue Cross Thong Kheng Home, located at 201 Jurong East Avenue 1, beside the Jurong Canal, and the All Saints Home, located at 20 Jurong East Avenue 1.

Jurong General Hospital

Under the Singapore Master Plan 2003, the new Jurong General Hospital, which would be located within walking distance from the Jurong East MRT station, was to be built by 2006 to replace the existing Alexandra Hospital.  It was to have 650 beds for inpatients and 90 specialist clinics for outpatients. However, in 2004, these plans were scrapped in favour of a new 500-bed hospital in Yishun to be called Khoo Teck Puat Hospital, planned for completion by 28 March 2009.

Under the Singapore Master Plan 2008, the plan for Jurong General Hospital was revived, and was ready in 2015, with 550 beds and next to Jurong East MRT Station, providing acute inpatient and outpatient care. It also has a community hospital next to it.

Industrial areas
ST Electronics Jurong East Building
CJ GLS Building
TT International Trade Park
The Chevrons
The Synergy
The JTC Summit

International Business Park
An International Business Park (IBP) is also located in Jurong East. Major companies and corporations present in the business park include Creative Technology, Sony, TYLin, Acer, Merck, Johnson & Johnson and JTC Corporation.

Gallery

References

External links 
 Yuhua Constituency Website
 Jurong Town Council

Places in Singapore
Jurong East